Kristine Mangasaryan (born 17 May 1991) is an Armenian football midfielder currently playing for Kokshe in the Kazakhstani Championship. She is a member of the Armenia women's national football team.

See also
List of Armenia women's international footballers

References

External links
 Kristine Mangasaryan at FFA.AM

1991 births
Living people
Armenian women's footballers
Armenia women's international footballers
Women's association football midfielders